Frances Cooke Macgregor (April 21, 1906 – December 24, 2001) was an American sociologist and photographer.

Books
This is America, a 1942 book with text by First Lady Eleanor Roosevelt and photographs by Frances Cooke Macgregor

References

1906 births
2001 deaths
20th-century American photographers